Anthony Thomas Jackson (18 February 1944 – 26 November 2006) was an English actor. He appeared as the founder of the eponymous ghost hiring agency in the BBC children's comedy series Rentaghost and as Sid Abbott’s neighbour Trevor, in the sitcom Bless This House.

Jackson began his career with the Birmingham Repertory Theatre. He studied at Rose Bruford College and in 1965 joined the Radio Drama Company by winning the Carlton Hobbs Bursary. Later he played at the Mermaid Theatre and the Nottingham Playhouse.

Roles 
Jackson played the part of The Tale Bearer (a narrator not included in the original story) in the 1968 BBC Radio 4 dramatisation of J. R. R. Tolkien's The Hobbit.

Jackson also provided a large number of voices in the animated children's series Ivor the Engine and went on to have roles in many long-running British television series. He also appeared in the sitcoms Bless This House, All Our Saturdays, Mind Your Language, Citizen Smith, Dynasty, The Detectives, Lovejoy, Softly, Softly, Barlow at Large and Only Fools and Horses. In his final years, he appeared in The Bill, Casualty, Footballers' Wives, Walker Texas Ranger and Doctors.

Voiceover 
Jackson also did voiceovers for animation including the TV series The Dreamstone, Budgie the Little Helicopter, Zokko!, The Ed and Zed Show, Shakespeare: The Animated Tales, Watership Down, The World of Peter Rabbit and Friends and Testament: The Bible in Animation and the film A Monkey's Tale.

He also did voices in live-action shows and films including The Storyteller, Labyrinth and A.D.A.M.

He found a niche in The Godot Company, and became one of its principal members.

Death 
Jackson died of cancer in London on 26 November 2006, having been ill during rehearsals of Waiting for Godot whilst the company was touring in Ireland.

Filmography

Film

Television

Radio

References

External links

1944 births
2006 deaths
Deaths from cancer in England
English male soap opera actors
English male voice actors
Male actors from Birmingham, West Midlands
Alumni of Rose Bruford College
British male comedy actors